Lily of the valley is a flowering plant.

Lily of the Valley or Lilies of the Valley may also refer to:

Art
 Lilies of the Valley (Fabergé egg), a jewelled Fabergé egg

Geography
Lilies of the Valley, twin islands on Lake Windemere

Literature
 Lily of the Valley (novel), a French novel

Music
 Lily of da Valley, a 2001 album by Japanese rap-rock band Dragon Ash
 Lily of the Valley, a 2012 album by Irish alternative rock band Funeral Suits
 "The Lily of the Valley", a Christian hymn
 "The Lily of the Valley", sung by Johnny Cash on his compilation album Personal File
 "Lily of the Valley" (song), a 1974 progressive rock song by Queen
"Lily of the Valley", a song by Swedish band Randy from No Carrots for the Rehabilitated
"Lily of the Valley", song by Marty Robbins from the B-side of "I Walk Alone"
"Lily of the Valley", song by Shenandoah from the B-side of "See If I Care"
"Lily of the Valley", song by country singer George Jones from Old Brush Arbors 1965
"Landyshi" (Ландыши/Lily of the Valley), song by USSR (now Russia) singer Gelena Velikanova, 1959

Lilies
"Lilies of the Valley" (Ландыши), most famous song of popular Soviet composer Oscar Feltsman
"Lilies of the Valley", song by David Byrne from David Byrne

Other uses 
 Lily of the Valley (horse), a racehorse
 Lily of the Valley (boat), a houseboat owned by Canadian pioneer John Moore Robinson

See also
 Lily of the valley tree
 Lily of the valley vine, Salpichroa origanifolia
 Lily of the Alley, 1924 film